Victoria East High School is one of two public high schools in the Victoria Independent School District in Victoria, Texas, United States. It has 1,885 students in grades 9 through 12. It is the 314th largest public high school in Texas and the 1,931st largest nationally. It has a student teacher ratio of 14.0 to 1.

Extracurricular activities 
Victoria East was moved to the state's second highest classification, 5A, in 2014 when Texas added a 6A classification.

Athletics 
The Victoria East Titans compete in the following sports:

 Baseball
 Basketball (boys' and girls')
 Cross country
 Football
 Golf (boys' and girls')
 Power-lifting
 Soccer (boys' and girls')
 Softball
 Swimming
 Tennis
 Track (boys' and girls')
 Volleyball
 Wrestling

Clubs 
The video game club meets Wednesdays after school, competing in SSBU, Rock Band, Minecraft, and more. On Tuesdays they play tabletop games like Uno and Magic: The Gathering.

References

External links
 

2010 establishments in Texas
Educational institutions established in 2010
Public high schools in Texas
Schools in Victoria County, Texas